is a distributor and broadcaster of anime by broadband access. It was established on March 1, 2002, by Bandai in coordination with Sunrise, Bandai Visual, and Bandai Networks. Its headquarters is located in Kajicho, Chiyoda, Tokyo.

By October 2003, Bandai Channel had exceeded  paid viewings.

List of program broadcast in the Bandai Channel

References

External links
  

Bandai Namco Holdings subsidiaries
Mass media companies of Japan
Mass media companies established in 2002
Bandai
Mass media in Tokyo
2002 establishments in Japan